Dai Lili is a former international table tennis player from China.

Table tennis career
From 1982 to 1988 she won several medals in singles, doubles, and team events in the Asian Table Tennis Championships and in the World Table Tennis Championships.

Her seven World Championship medals  included four gold medals; two in the team event and two in the doubles with Geng Lijuan and Shen Jianping. 

She also won an English Open title.

See also
 List of table tennis players
 List of World Table Tennis Championships medalists

References

Chinese female table tennis players
Living people
Asian Games medalists in table tennis
Table tennis players at the 1982 Asian Games
Table tennis players at the 1986 Asian Games
Year of birth missing (living people)
Sportspeople from Wenzhou
Table tennis players from Zhejiang
Medalists at the 1982 Asian Games
Medalists at the 1986 Asian Games
Asian Games gold medalists for China
Asian Games silver medalists for China